Shingkhar Lam Kunzang Wangchuk (1928 – 16 October 2014) was a Bhutanese politician, who served as a speaker of the Gyelyong Tshogdu (national assembly of Bhutan). After his uncle went missing, he served two Druk Gyalpos (kings) of Bhutan.

Early life 
Shingkhar Lam Kunzang Wangchuk was born in 1928 to Shingkhar Lam Koncho Gyaltshen and Pema Tshoki. He was a descendant of Longchenpa, a fourteenth-century Buddhist philosopher. He was recognized by his local community as the reincarnation of the lama Nyungne Rinpoche by the age of five, and soon entered into religious education and training. He visited Shingkhar, Kurtoe, and Zhongar for religious purposes.

Career 
At 16, he began serving Jigme Wangchuck, the second Druk Gyalpo (king) of Bhutan. According to Karma Phuntsho, a friend of Lam's, it was "customary" for vacancies in the king's court to be filled by relatives; Lam's uncle had served the king, but went missing around this time. After Jigme Wangchuck died, he retired for a few years, before serving the third Druk Gyalpo, Jigme Dorji Wangchuck. He was made a secretary to Jigme Dorji Wangchuck in 1964, and given the honorific Dasho in 1968. He was made speaker of the Gyelyong Tshogdu (the national assembly) and a deputy minister in 1971.

Retirement and death 
He retired in 1985. Since he was believed to be a reincarnated lama, he continued his religious duties in Shingkhar and Ura (the birthplace of a parent); there, he was referred to as Meme Dasho. Lam restored the Shingkhar Lhakhang, a monastery by his previously-incarnated "lineage", in 1999; he personally completed the artwork.

He died on 16 October 2014, a week after being admitted to a local hospital after experiencing a stroke.

References

Citations

Bibliography

 
 
 
 

 
 

1928 births
2014 deaths
Bhutanese politicians